Andreasi is a surname. Notable people with the surname include:

Felice Andreasi (1928–2005), Italian actor
Giorgio Andreasi (1467–1549), Italian Roman Catholic bishop
Ippolito Andreasi (1548–1608), Italian painter

See also
Andreas

Italian-language surnames
Patronymic surnames
Surnames from given names